The Baker Center may refer to:

 Howard H. Baker, Jr. Center for Public Policy, at the University of Tennessee
 John Calhoun Baker University Center, at Ohio University